Dods Parliamentary Companion (formerly "Dod's Parliamentary Companion") is an annual politics reference book published in the United Kingdom.

It provides biographies and contact information on members of the Houses of Parliament and the Civil Service.  It was first published in 1832 by Charles Dod; and is now published by the firm of Dods.

Dods also publishes on the web as Dods People (formerly "Dods Online").

References

External links
Dods People
Dods – publisher's website

1832 non-fiction books
Yearbooks
Parliament of the United Kingdom
British biographical dictionaries
Series of books